Nasrabad (also Romanized as Naṣrābād) is a village in Biabanak Rural District, in the Central District of Khur and Biabanak County, Isfahan Province, Iran. According to the 2006 census, its population was 42, in 16 families.

References 

Populated places in Khur and Biabanak County